Bob Delanty  (born 21 May 1940) is a former Australian rules footballer who played with Collingwood in the Victorian Football League (VFL).

Notes

External links 

1940 births
Australian rules footballers from Tasmania
Collingwood Football Club players
City-South Football Club players
Living people